The 1934–35 William & Mary Indians men's basketball team represented the College of William & Mary in intercollegiate basketball during the 1934–35 season. Under the first year of head coach Tom Dowler, the team finished the season with a 10–5 record. This was the 30th season of the collegiate basketball program at William & Mary, whose nickname is now the Tribe. William & Mary played the season as an independent.

Schedule

|-
!colspan=9 style="background:#006400; color:#FFD700;"| Regular season

Source

References

William & Mary Tribe men's basketball seasons
William And Mary Indians
William and Mary Indians Men's Basketball Team
William and Mary Indians Men's Basketball Team